WBGM (88.1 FM) is a radio station licensed to New Berlin, Pennsylvania. It is a sister station to WPGM (AM) and WPGM-FM, also located in New Berlin.

External links
 
 
 

Radio stations established in 1983

BGM